Damariscotta Lake is a lake in Lincoln County, Maine. Damariscotta Lake State Park in Jefferson occupies 19 acres at the far northern end of the lake. The lake is known for its annual run of alewives and the dam and fish ladder built in 1807 at Damariscotta Mills at the lake's southern tip.

References

Lakes of Maine
Lakes of Lincoln County, Maine